Lenomys is a genus of rodent endemic to Sulawesi. It contains the living  trefoil-toothed giant rat (Lenomys meyeri) and the extinct Lenomys grovesi.

References

Rodent genera
Mammal genera with one living species
Taxa named by Oldfield Thomas
Muridae
Rodents of Sulawesi